Malayinkeezhu is a suburb of Trivandrum, the largest city and capital of the Indian state of Kerala. It is located at the south-eastern side of Thiruvananthapuram Metropolitan Area, and is at a distance of 13 km from the heart of the city. The town is famous for the religious festival named Malayinkeezhu Aarattu. Neyyar Wildlife Sanctuary, one of the major tourist destinations in Thiruvananthapuram district is situated 17 km away from the town. The nearest airport is Trivandrum International Airport (16 km) and Balaramapuram Railway Station (9.1 km) is the nearest Railway Station. The Pincode of Malayinkeezhu Post Office is 695571 which comes under the postal circle of Neyyattinkara region.

Demographics
The Malayinkeezhu  has population of 37,350 of which 18,250 are males while 19,100 are females as per report released by Census India 2011.

Population of Children with age of 0-6 is 3351 which is 8.97% of total population of Malayinkeezhu. The  Female Sex Ratio is of 1047 against state average of 1084. Moreover Child Sex Ratio in Malayinkeezhu is around 968 compared to Kerala state average of 964. Literacy rate of Malayinkeezhu city is 95.01% higher than state average of 94.00%. In Malayinkeezhu, Male literacy is around 96.79% while female literacy rate is 93.32%.

Malayinkeezhu has total administration over 9,684 houses to which it supplies basic amenities like water and sewerage

Sites
The Sree Krishna Swami Temple of Malayinkeezhu is famous for its divinity. Premium residential area in trivandrum
  Major Malayinkeezhu Sree Krishna Swamy Temple

References

External links
 About Malayinkeezhu
 Malayinkeezhu Sree Krishna Swamy Temple

Villages in Thiruvananthapuram district